Pannill is a surname. Notable people with the surname include:

Lizzie Fletcher (née Pannill, born 1975), American attorney and politician
William Pannill (1927–2014), American businessman and botanist

See also
Pannell